Svetlana Vladimirovna Sokolovskaya (born 10 December 1965) is a Russian figure skating coach.

Personal life 
Sokolovskaya was born in Norilsk to a family of doctors. She studied at the Ust-Kamenogorsk Pedagogical Institute in Oskemen.

Together with her husband, she has a daughter, Elizabeth, born in 1990. Her grand-daughter Alexandra began skating at age 3. Sokolovskaya enjoys skiing and playing basketball.

Skating career 
Sokolovskaya began skating at age six in Norilsk. Her first coach was Zhanna Gromova, who also coached Irina Slutskaya.

She failed to achieve significant results in single skating and grew 12 cm tall, so her coach transferred her to ice dancing under the guidance of Yuri Razbeglov. Sokolovskaya quickly came to the conclusion that she really did not want to skate, but wanted to teach. She then entered the Pedagogical Institute in Oskemen in order to began her coaching career.

Coaching career 
After graduating from high school in 1987, Sokolovskaya began coaching. Her current students include: 
  Alexander Samarin 
  Alexandra Trusova
  Alina Urushadze
  Georgy Fedorov
  Maria Levushkina
  Mark Kondratiuk
  Nikolai Kolesnikov
  Sofia Samodelkina
  Timofei Platonov

Former students:
  Anastasiya Galustyan
 / Anna Ovcharova
  Arina Martynova
  Ekaterina Alexandrovskaya
  Elizabet Tursynbaeva
  Ivan Blagov
  Katarina Gerboldt
  Lilia Biktagirova
  Maria Sotskova
  Nelli Ioffe
 / Polina Shelepen
  Svetlana Panova
  Zhan Bush

References

External links 

 Sokolovskaya Team on Instagram
 Svetlana Sokolovskaya on Instagram

1965 births
Living people
Russian female ice dancers
Russian female single skaters
Russian figure skating coaches
People from Norilsk
Sportspeople from Krasnoyarsk Krai
Female sports coaches